Laguerreia is a monotypic moth genus in the family Erebidae. Its only species, Laguerreia inexpectata, is found in Bolivia. Both the genus and species were first described by Hervé de Toulgoët in 2000.

References

Phaegopterina
Monotypic moth genera
Moths of South America